The 1916–17 season was the 44th season of competitive football in Scotland and the 27th season of the Scottish Football League.

Scottish Football League

Champions: Celtic

Note: Due to increasing travel difficulties under war-time conditions, Aberdeen, Dundee and Raith Rovers were asked to retire from the League at the end of the season. Clydebank were elected to maintain an even number of teams.

Scottish Cup

There was no Scottish Cup competition played.

Other honours

County

Junior Cup

St Mirren Juniors won the Scottish Junior Cup after a 1–0 win over Renfrew in the final.

Scotland national team

There were no Scotland matches played with the British Home Championship suspended due to World War I.

See also
1916–17 Aberdeen F.C. season
1916–17 Rangers F.C. season
Association football during World War I

Notes and references

External links
Scottish Football Historical Archive

 
Seasons in Scottish football
Wartime seasons in Scottish football